Kadaicha (also known as Stones of Death) is a 1988 Australian horror film directed by James Bogle who called it "just very commercial stuff". It was the last of four low-budget films made by producers Tom Broadbridge and David Hannay for the video market. It was shot in Sydney.

Plot
A series of unexplained teenage murders occurs in an exclusive residential development.

Cast
Zoe Carides as Gail Sorensen
Eric Oldfield as Alex Sorensen
Tom Jennings as Matt Taylor
Natalie McCurry as Tracy Hocking
Kerry McKay as Shane
Fiona Gauntlett as Fizz Dryden
Bruce Hughes as Tony Pirrello
Steve Dodd as Billinudgel

References

External links

Kadaicha at Oz Movies

Australian horror films
1988 direct-to-video films
Films about Aboriginal Australians
1988 horror films
1988 films
1980s English-language films
1980s Australian films